Webasto SE is a company based in Stockdorf, Germany which makes sunroofs, electric-car chargers and air-conditioning systems. Holger Engelmann is the CEO of the company.

History

Coronavirus outbreak 
Webasto owns 11 locations in China, including in Wuhan. In late January 2020, the company disclosed that five of its workers had tested positive to SARS-CoV-2. This was reportedly one of the first cases of person-to-person transmission of the virus outside China.

The outbreak was handled internally within the company. The story was initially reported in the Wall Street Journal as a case of successful containment of the outbreak. By March 2020, genome studies tracking mutations of the virus suggested that the Webasto outbreak had not been successfully contained, and was linked to a 'decent part' of the overall coronavirus outbreak in Europe. Genetic sequencing also linked the cluster of cases at Webasto's headquarters to the virus outbreak in northern Italy. In May 2020 some medical disprove this assumptions and confirm that the Webasto case remained isolated, while in July other studies identified the most common Italian strain as coming from Germany.

Autonomous driving 
In 2022, Webasto has joined forces with Bosch to develop a self-driving car that will enable autonomous driving at Level 4. The company has integrated 25 sensors from Bosch into the roof of a prototype vehicle for this purpose.

Charging Division 
Webasto currently have offices in Monrovia, California for EV charging division. Some of the notable cordsets are SAE J1337 AC chargers for popular Ford MachE and GM vehicles.

Current production of roof modules 
 BMW 4 Series (F33) (2013–present)
 BMW Z4 (G29) (2018–present)
 Mazda MX-5 RF (2016–present)

Past production of roof modules 
 BMW 3 Series Cabriolet (E93) (2007-2013)
 Daihatsu Copen (2002-2012)
 Ferrari California (2008-2014)
 Ford Focus Coupé-Cabriolet (2006-2010)
 Mazda MX-5 Power Retractable Hard Top (2007-2015)
 Mini Cabriolet (2004-2008)
 Mitsubishi Colt CZC (2006-2012)
 Renault Wind (2010-2013)
 Volkswagen Eos (2006-2015)
 Volvo C70 (2006-2013)
 Porsche Cayenne GTS

References

External links 
 

Convertible top suppliers
Auto parts suppliers of Germany